East Baton Rouge Laboratory Academy, also known as EBR Lab, was a high school in Baton Rouge, Louisiana, United States. Established in 2007 and closed 2013, it offered a college preparatory program with smaller class sizes.

History
East Baton Rouge Laboratory Academy was one of East Baton Rouge Parish School System's first two autonomous schools, which have more flexibility than a traditional school but less than a charter school, opened in August 2007. The school's first graduating class was in 2011. The school closed in 2013.

Curriculum
EBR Lab offered a rigorous college preparatory curriculum.

Extracurricular activities

The school's athletic program included boys and girls basketball, boys and girls track and field, cross country, girls volleyball, bowling, and golf

References

External links
East Baton Rouge Laboratory Academy

Schools in Baton Rouge, Louisiana
Educational institutions established in 2007
Public high schools in Louisiana
2007 establishments in Louisiana